Nattenheim is a municipality in the district of Bitburg-Prüm, in Rhineland-Palatinate, western Germany.

It is located 8 km north of Bitburg, 38 km north of Trier, and 37 km east of the German border with Luxembourg.

References

Bitburg-Prüm